Todd Richards may refer to:

Todd Richards (snowboarder) (born 1969), American snowboarder
Todd Richards (ice hockey) (born 1966), American ice hockey player and coach